Black Out p.s. Red Out is a 1998 Greek drama film directed by Menelaos Karamaghiolis. It was entered into the 21st Moscow International Film Festival.

Cast
 Alkis Kourkoulos as Hristos
 Mirto Alikaki as Maria
 Kleon Gregoriadis as Stavros
 Hanna Schygulla as Martha
 Karyofyllia Karabeti as Ruth
 Dimitris Papaioannou as Lou
 Nikos Georgakis as Stavros
 Elena Nathanail as Hristos' Mother
 Kostas Apostolidis
 Stavros Mermighis

References

External links
 

1998 films
1998 drama films
Greek drama films
1990s Greek-language films